Vizagapatam District was a district in the Madras Presidency of British India.

History

During the British rule in India, Vizagapatam emerged as a district. It is one of the largest district in British India. On 1 April 1936, Bihar and Orissa Province was split to form Bihar Province and Orissa Province. Parts of the Vizagapatam District and the Ganjam District (excluding Ichchapuram, Palasa, Tekkali, Pathapatnam and Srikakulam) of Madras Presidency  were transferred to Orissa Province along with portions of the Vizagapatam Hill Tracts Agency and Ganjam Hill Tracts Agency.

Present day it covers the areas of Visakhapatnam, Vizianagaram, Anakapalli, Alluri Sitharama Raju, Parvathipuram Manyam and part of Srikakulam districts of Andhra Pradesh and Koraput, Malkangiri, Nabarangapur, Ganjam and Rayagada districts of Odisha. The Vizagapatnam city is the administrative headquarters of the district.

Taluks 
Vizagapatam district was sub-divided into 22 taluks some of which were agencies.

 Koraput Agency (Headquarters: Koraput)
 Nowrangapur Agency (Headquarters: Nowrangapur)

See also
History of Visakhapatnam

References

Districts of the Madras Presidency
History of Andhra Pradesh
History of Odisha